Asphalt most often refers to:
 Bitumen, also known as "liquid asphalt cement" or simply "asphalt", a viscous form of petroleum mainly used as a binder in asphalt concrete
 Asphalt concrete, a mixture of bitumen with coarse and fine aggregates, used as a road surface

Asphalt may also refer to:
 Asphalt (1929 film), a German silent film by Joe May
 Asphalt (1964 film), a South Korean film by Kim Ki-young
 Asphalt (novel), an American novel by Carl Hancock Rux 
 Asphalt (series), a racing game series produced by Gameloft
 Asphalt, Kentucky
 USS Asphalt (IX-153), a Trefoil-class concrete barge 
 Asphalt modified racing, a variant of modified stock car racing using cars designed for asphalt surfaces

See also
 Asphaltum, Indiana
 Shilajit or black asphaltum, an organic-based clay